Serge Anousoune Prasitharath (born 5 February 1984 in Luang Prabang, Laos) is a French-Laotian former footballer and futsal player who last played for Bruguières SC Futsal and the  France national futsal team. He has worked as a mechanic in Fenouillet.

Career

Singapore

A member of Etoile's 18-man squad for the 2010 S.League, Prasitharath was unable to participate in the season as S.League regulations stipulate that players must pass a fitness test  which he failed on all three attempts before leaving the club.

Futsal

In late 2012 and January 2013, Prasitharath was called up to represent the France national futsal team.

He has been described as having good technical abilities by Bruguières mentor Jean-Christophe Martinez.

References

External links 
 Sanogo – Prasitharath : [2/4] Le futsal
 Sanogo – Prasitharath : [3/4] La Division 1
 Sanogo – Prasitharath : [4/4] Le derby
 Etoile FC 'loan out' Serge Prasitharath
 at Footballdatabse.eu

Association football forwards
Living people
Toulouse FC players
Laotian expatriate footballers
French expatriate footballers
Expatriate footballers in Switzerland
French footballers
French men's futsal players
Louhans-Cuiseaux FC players
Laotian footballers
Association football midfielders
Laotian emigrants to France
People from Luang Prabang
Expatriate footballers in Singapore
US Colomiers Football players
Toulouse Rodéo FC players
1984 births

Naturalized citizens of France